Jorge Eduardo Márquez (born 1 March 1990) is a Mexican footballer who plays for Puebla F.C., mainly as a striker. He started off his football career at Atlético Lagunero who play in the Mexican second division. He was invited by Puebla FC to pre season camp on June 3, 2011 where he earned a spot in the first club's squad.

External links
Player Profile MediTiempo
 Player Profile Femexfut

References

1990 births
Living people
Mexican footballers
Club Puebla players
Association football forwards